Satyendranath Tagore (1 June 1842 – 9 January 1923) was an Indian civil servant, poet, composer, writer, social reformer   and linguist from Kolkata, West Bengal. He was the first Indian who became an Indian Civil Service officer in 1863 He was a member of Bramho Samaj.

Biography 
He was born to Maharshi Debendranath Tagore and Sarada Devi on 1 June 1842 at Tagore family of Jorasanko in Kolkata. His wife was Jnanadanandini Devi. They had one son and one daughter Surendranath Tagore and Indira Devi Chaudhurani respectively. He was a student of Presidency College. He was the first Indian officer of  Indian Civil Service (ICS). He joined the service in 1864.

Literary works 

 Sushila O Birsingha
 Bombai Chitra
 Nabaratnamala
 Striswadhinata
Bouddhadharma
Amar Balyakotha O Bombai Prabas
Bharatbarsiyo Ingrej
Raja Rammohan Roy
Birsingha
Amar Balyakotha
Atmakotha
Shrimadbhagvatgita
He wrote many songs. His patriotic Bengali language song "Mile Sabe Bharat Santan, Ektan Gago Gaan" (unite, India's children, sing in unison), which was hailed as the first national anthem of India.

Death 
He died on 9 January 1923 in Kolkata.

See also 

 Tagore family
 List of Indian members of the Indian Civil Service
 List of Kolkata Presidencians
 Hindu Mela
 List of Bengali-language authors (alphabetical)

References

External links 
Satyendranath Tagore at Bengali wikisource
https://indianmasterminds.com/features/tales-from-the-legends/satyendranath-tagore-the-first-indian-civil-servant/
https://www.thebrahmosamaj.net/samajes/adibrahmosamaj.html
https://iasbabuji.com/ias-ips-officers/satyendranath-tagore/
https://granthagara.com/writer/1854-satyendranath-tagore/

1842 births
1923 deaths
Bengali writers
Bengali Hindus
Indian writers
Linguists
People from Kolkata
Indian civil servants
Indian Civil Service (British India) officers
Indian composers
Indian social reformers
Social workers from West Bengal
Writers from West Bengal
19th-century Bengalis
20th-century Bengalis